Addison Township is one of the fifteen townships of Gallia County, Ohio, United States. As of the 2010 census, the population was 2,197, down from 2,366 at the 2000 census.

Geography
Located in the northeastern part of the county, it is bordered by the following townships:
Cheshire Township - north
Gallipolis Township - south
Green Township - southwest corner
Springfield Township - west
Morgan Township - northwest corner

Mason County, West Virginia, lies across the Ohio River to the east.

It is located upstream of four of Gallia County's five other Ohio River townships.

No municipalities are located in Addison Township.

Name and history
It is the only Addison Township statewide.

Government
The township is governed by a three-member board of trustees, who are elected in November of odd-numbered years to a four-year term beginning on the following January 1. Two are elected in the year after the presidential election and one is elected in the year before it. There is also an elected township fiscal officer, who serves a four-year term beginning on April 1 of the year after the election, which is held in November of the year before the presidential election. Vacancies in the fiscal officership or on the board of trustees are filled by the remaining trustees.

References

External links
County website

Townships in Gallia County, Ohio
Townships in Ohio